Piz Tremoggia is a mountain in the Bernina Range of the Alps, located on the border between Italy and Switzerland. It lies between the Val Fex (Graubünden) and the Val Malenco (Lombardy).

References

External links
 Piz Tremoggia on Hikr

Bernina Range
Mountains of Graubünden
Mountains of Lombardy
Mountains of the Alps
Alpine three-thousanders
Italy–Switzerland border
International mountains of Europe
Mountains of Switzerland
Sils im Engadin/Segl